Crijn Hendricksz Volmarijn (1601 in Rotterdam – 1645 in Rotterdam), was a Dutch Golden Age painter.

Biography
According to the RKD he was a follower of Caravaggio known for his historical allegories.
He was probably related to Pieter Crijnse Volmarijn, who became a pupil of his friend Hendrik Martenszoon Sorgh.

References

Crijn Hendricksz. Volmarijn on Artnet

1601 births
1645 deaths
Dutch Golden Age painters
Dutch male painters
Painters from Rotterdam